Jeotgalicoccus huakuii is a gram-positive bacterium. The cells are coccoid. It is moderately halophilic, (salt-tolerant) it grows in the presence of 0–23% NaCl, optimal values are 3 -8%. It belongs to the family Staphylococcaceae.

References

Further reading

External links
Type strain of Jeotgalicoccus huakuii at BacDive -  the Bacterial Diversity Metadatabase

huakuii
Bacteria described in 2010